Krasnyi Yar is a village in Luhansk Raion of Luhansk Oblast of eastern Ukraine, at about 30 km SE from the centre of Luhansk city.

The settlement was taken under control of pro-Russian forces during the War in Donbas, that started in 2014.

Demographics
In 2001 the settlement had 41 inhabitants. Native language as of the Ukrainian Census of 2001:
Ukrainian – 14.63%
Russian – 85.37%

References

Villages in Luhansk Raion